Great Divide is the third studio album by Scottish alternative rock band Twin Atlantic.

On 31 March 2014 Zane Lowe premiered lead single "Heart and Soul" as the Hottest Record in the World on BBC Radio 1. It has peaked at #17 on the UK Singles Chart. On 24 August 2014, Great Divide became the band's highest charting album to date reaching #1 on the Scottish Album Charts and #6 on the UK charts.

Reception

The album was included at number 23 on Kerrang!s "The Top 50 Rock Albums Of 2014" list.

Track listing
All songs are written and composed by Twin Atlantic.

Weekly charts

References

2014 albums
Twin Atlantic albums
Red Bull Records albums